The Jewish People's Institute is a historic Jewish community center building located at 3500 W. Douglas Boulevard in the North Lawndale community area of Chicago, Illinois. The community center had its roots in the Chicago Hebrew Institute, which was founded in 1903 by the city's established Jewish community to support new immigrants. Its building, which was designed by architects Grunsfeld & Klaber, was completed in 1927. The Institute provided both social and educational services to the Jewish community and was often the first point of contact in Chicago for new immigrants. Its educational offerings included evening classes, a Hebrew school, and eventually a junior college, while its social programs included a theatre, recreational areas, and a Naturalization Bureau for those who sought American citizenship.

The building was listed on the National Register of Historic Places on November 15, 1978. It is now occupied by the Lawndale Community Academy.

References

Buildings and structures on the National Register of Historic Places in Chicago
Buildings and structures completed in 1927
Community centers in the United States
Jews and Judaism in Chicago
Chicago Landmarks